Tuoba (Tabγač or Tabghach; also Taγbač or Taghbach) is an extinct language spoken by the Tuoba people in northern China around the 5th century AD during the Northern Wei dynasty.

Classification
Alexander Vovin (2007) identifies the Tuoba language as a Mongolic language.

On the other hand, Juha Janhunen proposed that the Tuoba might have spoken an Oghur Turkic language. According to Peter Boodberg, the Tuoba language was essentially Turkic with Mongolic admixture. Chen Sanping noted that the Tuoba language "had both" Turkic and Mongolic elements. 

Liu Xueyao stated that Tuoba may have had their own language, which should not be assumed to be identical with any other known languages.

Andrew Shimunek (2017) classifies Tuoba (Tabghach) as a "Serbi" (i.e., para-Mongolic) language. Shimunek's Serbi branch also consists of the Tuyuhun and Khitan languages.

Morphology
Some functional suffixes are:

 *-A(y) ~ *ʁa(y) ‘verbal noun suffix’
 *-Al ~ *-l ‘deverbal noun suffix’
 **čɪ ~ **či ‘suffix denoting occupations’
 **-mɔr/-mʊr (萬) ‘deverbal noun suffix’
 **-n ‘plural suffix’

Lexicon

Selected basic Taghbach words from Shimunek (2017) are listed below. Forms reconstructed using the comparative method are marked with one asterisk (*), while forms reconstructed according to the Chinese fanqie spellings and/or rhymes of the traditional Chinese philological tradition are marked with two asterisks (**) (originally marked as ✩ by Shimunek 2017).

References

 
 

Languages attested from the 5th century
Agglutinative languages
Unclassified languages of Asia
Languages of China
Medieval languages
Extinct languages of Asia
Tuoba